Moore-Mann House is a historic home located at Columbia, South Carolina. It built about 1903, and is a -story, irregular plan, Queen Anne style frame dwelling. It features a one-story verandah, bay windows, decorative shingles and an arched entrance. It was designed by W. B. Smith Whaley, Co., a prominent Columbia architectural and engineering firm, whose owner also built the W. B. Smith Whaley House.

It was added to the National Register of Historic Places in 1979.

References

Houses on the National Register of Historic Places in South Carolina
Queen Anne architecture in South Carolina
Houses completed in 1903
Houses in Columbia, South Carolina
National Register of Historic Places in Columbia, South Carolina